Wrestling Ernest Hemingway is a 1993 American romantic drama film written by Steve Conrad and directed by Randa Haines, starring Richard Harris, Robert Duvall, Sandra Bullock, Shirley MacLaine, and Piper Laurie. The film is about two elderly men in Florida who form a friendship and the romantic relationships they have with the women in their respective lives. Wrestling Ernest Hemingway garnered mixed reviews from critics, praising the performances but criticized the overly melodramatic and sentimental direction of the plot. It was also a box-office bomb, grossing $278,720 against a $20 million budget.

Plot
Frank is a retired Irish seaman. Walter is a retired Cuban barber. They are two lonely old men living in Florida, trapped in the emptiness of their own lives.

When they meet in a park, the flamboyant Frank is finally able to start a conversation with the introverted Walter after several attempts. They begin to spend time together and become friends, sometimes meeting at the snack shop where Walter orders the same food every day and becomes fond of Elaine, a young waitress.

Frank's salty talk and crude behavior in public offend Walter and threaten their friendship. In the meantime, Frank attempts to start a romance with Georgia, a woman he meets at the movies, while dealing with Helen, his landlord who is put off by his manner.

Cast
 Robert Duvall as Walter
 Richard Harris as Frank
 Shirley MacLaine as Helen Cooney
 Sandra Bullock as Elaine
 Piper Laurie as Georgia

Reception
On Rotten Tomatoes, the film has a 59% approval rating based on 22 reviews, with an average score of 5.9/10. The site's consensus states: "Predictable but moving, Wrestling Ernest Hemingway is an understated and melancholic drama that gets plenty of mileage out of an outstanding cast that includes Robert Duvall, Richard Harris, Shirley MacLaine, and Sandra Bullock."

Roger Ebert wrote that: "[T]he movie is essentially about the close observation of behavior. Like some of Hemingway's stories, the real action is all implied. The characters trade small talk, and we sense that larger issues are lurking beneath their cheerfulness." Caryn James of The New York Times gave credit to Harris and Duvall for giving "two intelligent but distant performances" and the actresses for being "appealing" in their "understandably tiny" roles, but felt the film suffers from an overlong runtime, "an easy, sentimental impulse" to its scenes and succumbs to the "scenery chewing and predictability" of its elderly-focused tale, saying "Instead of simply assuming that the old have interesting lives, the film never stops congratulating itself for being daring enough to focus on them. It shows the terrible strain of trying too hard." Louis Black of The Austin Chronicle praised Harris and Duvall's screen chemistry, and the actresses for being "outstanding" in their roles but was critical of the "superficial melodramatic stereotyping" throughout the story, saying "[I]t's another right of passage movie that pinballs off of clichés as though that is a way to achieve meaning. But there are those performances." Ty Burr of Entertainment Weekly gave the film a C grade, saying it "feels canned and inert" with Haines' direction and Michael Convertino's score turning the male bonding scenes into "swollen epiphanies" when compared to the "richly funny observations" in Grumpy Old Men, adding that Harris gives "a gutsy performance in a gutless movie."

References

External links
 
 

1993 films
1993 romantic drama films
1990s American films
1990s English-language films
1990s buddy drama films
American buddy drama films
American romantic drama films
Films about old age
Films directed by Randa Haines
Films scored by Michael Convertino
Films set in Florida